Events from the year 1990 in South Korea.

Incumbents
President: Roh Tae-woo
Prime Minister: Kang Young-hoon (until December 27), Ro Jai-bong (starting December 27)

Events
December Unknown date – A first convenience store retail GS25 (then LG25) open in downtown Seoul.

Sport

 1990 K League
 South Korea wins the 1990 Dynasty Cup
 South Korea lose all their matches at the FIFA World Cup

Films

 List of South Korean films of 1990

Births

 January 9 - Choi Su-min, handball player
 January 15 - Dayen Zheng, Australian entertainer
 January 31 - Park Hae-mi, sport shooter
 February 10 - Choi Sooyoung, singer and actress
 February 14 - Park Ki-ju, field hockey player
 February 19 - Lee Elijah, actress and model
 February 24 - Ryu Eun-hee, handball player
 March 20 - Jung Kyung-eun, badminton player
 March 24 - Na Ah-reum, road cyclist
 March 26 - Xiumin, singer and actor
 March 31 - Bang Yongguk, rapper, songwriter and record producer 
 April 8 - Kim Jonghyun, singer (d. 2017)
 May 21 - Choi In-jeong, fencer
 May 30 - Im Yoona, singer and actress
 June 30 - N, singer, actor, presenter, and radio host (VIXX)
 August 10 - Lee Sung-kyung, model and actress
 August 27 - Nam Yeong-sin, handball player
 August 31 - Lee Kye-rim, sport shooter
 October 23 - Lee Eun-bi, handball player
 October 26 - Bae Yeon-ju, badminton player
 November 10 - Leo, singer, songwriter and musical theatre actor
 November 22 
 Jang Dongwoo, singer, rapper and actor 
 Seo Eunkwang, singer 
 November 29 - Lee Minhyuk, singer, rapper, songwriter and actor

Deaths
 24 September – Kang Joon-ho, boxer (b. 1928)

See also
List of South Korean films of 1990
Years in Japan
Years in North Korea

References

 
South Korea
Years of the 20th century in South Korea
South Korea
1990s in South Korea